WQSN is an Alternative Rock formatted broadcast radio station licensed to Norton, Virginia, serving Big Stone Gap, Pennington Gap, and Clintwood in Virginia, Whitesburg, Cumberland, and Jenkins in Kentucky, and Kingsport in Tennessee.  WQSN is owned and operated by Bristol Broadcasting Company, Inc.  WQSN simulcasts the programming of sister-station WEXX.

History
Originally WNVA-FM, the station first launched on July 25, 1969.  WNVA went on the air, on the AM side, on March 6, 1946, with a broadcasting power of 250 watts. WNVA was first owned and operated by the Blan Fox Radio Company and was affiliated with Mutual Broadcasting System, but has always remained under the same ownership since its conception in 1946.

On December 28, 2008, WNVA-FM changed its format from the Jones Radio Network's Hot AC to the New Dial Global's Classic Hit Country.

On July 15, 2010 at midnight, WNVA-FM changed its format from Dial Global's Classic Hit Country to Citadel Media's Hits & Favorites network.  As of August 2014, WNVA-FM was silent.

Radio-Wise Inc. sold WNVA-FM and sister station WNVA to Bristol Broadcasting Company for $35,000, enough to settle property tax debts and outstanding FCC fines; the sale closed on January 16, 2015.

The station changed its call sign to WSMQ on August 28, 2017, and to WQSN on September 4, 2017.

References

External links
 99-3 The X Online
 

Wise County, Virginia
1969 establishments in Virginia
Modern rock radio stations in the United States
Radio stations established in 1969
QSN